is the a live video album by the Japanese girl band Princess Princess, released on August 21, 1996, by Sony Records. It was recorded on May 31, 1996, at Nippon Budokan on the band's final concert before their disbandment.

Track listing 
All music is composed by Kaori Okui, except where indicated; all music is arranged by Princess Princess.

CD version

The audio recording of the concert was released on CD on December 1, 1996. It peaked at No. 26 on Oricon's albums chart.

Track listing 
All music is composed by Kaori Okui, except where indicated; all music is arranged by Princess Princess.

Charts

References

External links
  (DVD)
  (CD)
 

Princess Princess (band) albums
1996 live albums
Sony Music Entertainment Japan live albums
Japanese-language live albums